Dmytro Stanislavovych Zayikyn (born 6 April 1997) is a Ukrainian professional football striker.

Career
Zayikyn is the product of the FC Dynamo Kyiv School System from the age of six. He played for FC Skala Stryi in the Ukrainian Second League. In July 2016 he signed a three-year contract with the team FC Karpaty. He made his debut for FC Karpaty as a substituted player in the second half-time in a game against FC Dynamo Kyiv on 31 July 2016 in the Ukrainian Premier League.

References

External links
 

1997 births
Living people
Ukrainian footballers
FC Skala Stryi (2004) players
FC Karpaty Lviv players
NK Veres Rivne players
FC Nyva Ternopil players
Ukrainian Premier League players
Ukrainian Second League players
Footballers from Kyiv
Association football forwards